Pleckstrin homology and RhoGEF domain containing G3 is a protein that in humans is encoded by the PLEKHG3 gene.

References

Further reading